Urszula Łukomska (1 December 1926 – 28 November 1986) was a Polish gymnast. She was born in Poznań. She competed at the 1952 Summer Olympics, in women's gymnastics. 

She died on 28 November 1986 in Poznań.

References

External links 
 

1926 births
1986 deaths
Sportspeople from Poznań
Polish gymnasts
Olympic gymnasts of Poland
Polish female artistic gymnasts
Gymnasts at the 1952 Summer Olympics
20th-century Polish women